"Promises" is the title of a 1981 song by Barbra Streisand. The song was written by Barry Gibb and Robin Gibb, who also provide backing vocals. It was the fourth of four singles released from her album Guilty.

"Promises" narrowly missed the Pop Top 40 in the U.S., peaking at number 48.  However, it reached the Top 10 on the Adult Contemporary charts, reaching number eight, and number five in Canada.

Chart history

References

External links
  

Columbia Records singles
Barbra Streisand songs
1981 songs
1981 singles
Songs written by Barry Gibb
Songs written by Robin Gibb